Ezequiel Nicolás Miralles Sabugo (born 21 July 1983) is an Argentine footballer that currently plays for Liniers  as a striker.

Club career
He began his football career at Huracán de Tres Arroyos of the second tier of his country, where he scored 3 goals in 24 appearances during one season, and also earned the Primera B title. In June 2006, after successful spells at Ferro Carril Oeste and Defensa y Justicia, Miralles joined to Argentine Primera División powerhouse club Racing Club de Avellaneda. After a regular pass Racing, in which he failed to score goals in six games, he moved to Talleres de Córdoba.

In January 2008, he traveled to Chile and signed for Chilean Primera División club Everton. In his first tournament, the Apertura Tournament of that year, Miralles won his first title in the Chilean football, after of defeat to Colo-Colo at the Sausalito Stadium. After two successful seasons at the club of Viña del Mar, in where scored 13 goals in 29 games, on 2 June 2009, was sold to Colo-Colo for a US$1.2 transfer fee, club that lost the final with Everton in the 2008 Apertura Tournament. He debuted in an historic game against Eastern Island, that his club won 4–0 and his first goal came on 22 August against O'Higgins in a 2–2 away draw after a notable free kick in the last minute of game. He earned his first title with Colo-Colo, the Clausura Tournament, in where he netted 11 goals in 16 games. In the next year, Miralles was the key player of his club in a regular 2010 season, scoring thirteen goals in 22 appearances, in a season in which the team had two coaches Hugo Tocalli and Diego Cagna. In the next season, Miralles had a regular performance in the 2011 season, but was the team's goalscorer with eight just one goal over Esteban Paredes that had six goals. On 21 May 2011, Colo-Colo accepted a US$2.4 million bid to the Brazilian Série A club Grêmio, being confirmed that he joined to the club of Porto Alegre when the Apertura ends.

After his successful incorporation to Grêmio, Miralles debuted for the seventh week of the 2011 Campeonato Brasileiro Série A in a 2–2 home draw with Avaí and his first goal came on 27 July against America (MG), in a 1–1 draw. Because his lack of opportunities, he expressed that would leave the club at the end of season.

On 6 July 2012, Miralles signed for Santos FC, after a swap for Elano. Despite being a regular in Santos' squad, he left the club a year later, joining Atlante.

Career statistics
(Correct )

Honours

Club
Talleres de Córdoba
 Primera B (1): 2004

Everton
 Primera División de Chile (1): 2008 Apertura

Colo-Colo
 Primera División de Chile (1): 2009 Clausura

Santos
 Recopa Sudamericana (1): 2012

References

External links
 
 Ezequiel Miralles at Football-Lineups
 

1983 births
Living people
Sportspeople from Bahía Blanca
Argentine footballers
Argentine expatriate footballers
Association football forwards
Quilmes Atlético Club footballers
Huracán de Tres Arroyos footballers
Ferro Carril Oeste footballers
Defensa y Justicia footballers
Talleres de Córdoba footballers
Racing Club de Avellaneda footballers
Everton de Viña del Mar footballers
Colo-Colo footballers
Grêmio Foot-Ball Porto Alegrense players
Santos FC players
Atlante F.C. footballers
Olimpo footballers
Chilean Primera División players
Campeonato Brasileiro Série A players
Liga MX players
Expatriate footballers in Chile
Expatriate footballers in Brazil
Expatriate footballers in Mexico
Argentine expatriate sportspeople in Chile
Argentine expatriate sportspeople in Brazil
Argentine expatriate sportspeople in Mexico